Greg Russo is an American screenwriter and director. He is best known for writing the 2021 film adaptation of Mortal Kombat. He is also set to write a sequel to the 2017 film Death Note, adaptations of F.E.A.R. Saints Row, Space Invaders and System Shock, which he will also direct.

Career 
Russo's first break came in 2010, when he optioned the contained thriller spec script "Down" to Relativity Media.

He followed up "Down" in October 2010 with the highly received action thriller spec "I-95" which placed #3 overall with 97 votes on the year end HIT LIST - a list of the best un-produced original screenplays in Hollywood hosted by The Tracking Board. "I-95" was later changed to "Autobahn" and optioned by Inferno Entertainment.

In 2011, Russo sold an original action/thriller pitch entitled "Black Ice" to Alloy Entertainment. He also worked on the Paramount action film "Heatseekers" produced by Michael Bay.

In 2012, Russo was hired to write the action film "High Speed" for Act of Valor director Scott Waugh.

In 2013, Russo was hired by Relativity Media to adapt the sci-fi/action Arcana comic "Continuum" into a feature film. Later that year, Universal Pictures hired Russo to adapt its action/spy film It Takes a Thief based on the TV series of the same name.

In the summer of 2014, Russo sold the original TV pilot "Chop Shop" to 20th Century Fox with Chris Morgan producing.

In 2015, New Line Cinema hired Russo to pen disaster thriller "Category 6" a sequel to the film Into the Storm

In November 2016, it was announced that Russo would be penning an adaptation of the 1992 video game Mortal Kombat for New Line Cinema, directed by Simon McQuoid and produced by James Wan. The film was released on April 23, 2021, and grossed $83.7 million worldwide. The film currently holds an 86% audience approval rating on Rotten Tomatoes.

In May 2017, Russo was initially attached as writer for Resident Evil: Welcome to Raccoon City, but confirmed in November 2018 that he was no longer involved with the project. In was also revealed that Russo was hired by Sony Pictures to adapt the anime Robotech into a feature film.

In May 2018, Russo was hired to write an adaptation of the 2005 video game F.E.A.R. Also in 2018, Russo was hired by New Line Cinema to pen an adaptation of the DC Comics title Highwaymen.

In August 2018, it was announced that Russo would be penning the sequel to the 2017 American adaptation of Death Note for Netflix. Russo also affirmed that the film will be more faithful to the source material.

In April 2019, Russo became attached to write an adaptation of the Saints Row franchise, with F. Gary Gray set to direct. Later in July, Russo was attached to write an adaptation of Space Invaders for New Line Cinema.

In January 2022, it was announced that Russo would direct, write and executive produce a television adaptation of System Shock for the streaming service Binge. The series will mark Russo's directorial debut.

References

American male screenwriters
American television directors
Living people
Year of birth missing (living people)